Magnús Torfi Ólafsson (5 May 1923 – 3 November 1998) was an Icelandic politician and former minister for social affairs from May to August 1974.

External links 
Non auto-biography of Magnús Torfi Ólafsson on the parliament website

1923 births
1998 deaths
Magnús Torfi Ólafsson
Magnús Torfi Ólafsson